Nazyvayevsky District is an administrative and municipal district (raion), one of the thirty-two in Omsk Oblast, Russia. It is located in the west of the oblast. Its administrative center is the town of Nazyvayevsk (which is not administratively a part of the district). Population: 12,372 (2010 Census);

Administrative and municipal status
Within the framework of administrative divisions, Nazyvayevsky District is one of the thirty-two in the oblast. The town of Nazyvayevsk serves as its administrative center, despite being incorporated separately as a town of oblast significance—an administrative unit with the status equal to that of the districts.

As a municipal division, the district is incorporated as Nazyvayevsky Municipal District, with the town of oblast significance of Nazyvayevsk being incorporated within it as Nazyvayevsk Urban Settlement.

References

Notes

Sources



Districts of Omsk Oblast